Jan Józef Kasprzyk (born 12 March 1975) is a Polish historian and politician. Acting Head of the Office for War Veterans and Victims of Oppression, serving since 1 January 2016.

Biography
Kasprzyk holds a master’s degree from the University of Warsaw. In the years 1994-1996 he was a journalist for Radio Warsaw. He is the longtime president of the Association of Piłsudskiites. Kasprzyk is the author of several books on the Second Polish Republic.

In 2005 he was appointed as the Spokesman for the Ministry of Culture and National Heritage, serving until 2007. From 2005 to 2006 Kasprzyk was the chairman of the Ochota District Council. He was a member of the Political Council of Law and Justice in the years 2006–2010. Kasprzyk serves as the vice chairman of the Ochota District Council.

On 8 December 2015 Kasprzyk was appointed by the Minister of Family, Labour and Social Policy, Elżbieta Rafalska, as the Deputy Head of the Office for War Veterans and Victims of Oppression. On 1 February 2016 Prime Minister Beata Szydło entrusted him with the responsibilities of the Head of the Office of War Veterans and Victims of Oppression.

Awards
 Silver Cross of Merit
 Medal Pro Patria
 Pro Memoria Medal

External links
 Jan Józef Kasprzyk

1975 births
Councillors in Warsaw
Law and Justice politicians
Living people
21st-century Polish historians
Polish male non-fiction writers
Polish opinion journalists
Polish radio journalists
Recipients of the Pro Patria Medal
Recipients of the Silver Cross of Merit (Poland)
Recipients of the Pro Memoria Medal
University of Warsaw alumni